Phillip Allen Talbert is an American lawyer who is the United States attorney for the Eastern District of California.

Education 

Talbert earned a Bachelor of Arts from Harvard University in 1984, a Master of Economics from the University of Sydney in 1987, and a Juris Doctor from the UCLA School of Law in 1989.

Career 

In 1989 and 1990, Talbert served as a law clerk for Judge David R. Thompson of the United States Court of Appeals for the Ninth Circuit. From 1990 to 1993, he served as a trial attorney in the United States Department of Justice Criminal Division. From 1993 to 1996, he was an associate at the Seattle office of Stoel Rives. From 1996 to 2002, he served as counsel in the Office of Professional Responsibility. He served as Acting United States Attorney for the Eastern District of California from 2016 to 2017. On April 22, 2022, he was nominated to serve in the role permanently. On April 25, 2022, his nomination was sent to the Senate. On June 16, 2022, his nomination was reported out of committee by voice vote. His nomination was confirmed by the full United States Senate via voice vote on June 23, 2022.

References 

Living people
20th-century American lawyers
21st-century American lawyers
Assistant United States Attorneys
California lawyers
Harvard College alumni
UCLA School of Law alumni
University of Sydney alumni
United States Attorneys for the Eastern District of California
United States Department of Justice lawyers
United States Department of Justice officials
Year of birth missing (living people)